IC 3568 is a planetary nebula that is 1.3 kiloparsecs (4500 ly) away from Earth in the constellation of Camelopardalis (just 7.5 degrees from Polaris). It is a relatively young nebula and has a core diameter of only about 0.4 light years.  It was dubbed the Lemon Slice Nebula by Jim Kaler, due to its appearance in one false-colour image from the Hubble Space Telescope. The Lemon Slice Nebula is one of the most simple nebulae known, with an almost perfectly spherical morphology. The core of the nebula does not have a distinctly visible structure in formation and is mostly composed of ionized helium. A faint halo of interstellar dust surrounds the nebula. The central star of the planetary nebula is an O-type star with a spectral type of O(H)3.

IC 3568 was discovered on August 31, 1900 by the American astronomer Robert Grant Aitken while using Lick Observatory's 12" Clark Refractor. While examining Comet Borrelly-Brooks, he found that the star BD +83° 357 in Camelopardalis is surrounded by a small circular nebula. This was confirmed with the observatory's 36" Refractor the next night. IC 3568 was misclassified as a compact galaxy in the Uppsala General Catalogue, as UGC 7731.

See also
NGC 40 (the Bow-Tie Nebula in Cepheus)

References

External links 
 

Planetary nebulae
Camelopardalis (constellation)
IC objects